Princeton was founded by Europeans in the latter part of the 17th century.  Because of a dispute over school taxes, the municipality split into the Borough of Princeton and Princeton Township in 1894, and both became fully independent municipalities. On January 1, 2013, the two consolidated as Princeton under a borough form of government.

Princeton

1813–1893 

Mayors of Princeton, New Jersey:
 1813-05–1817-12: Samuel Bayard
 1818-03–1823-02: Ercursion Beatty (died February 1823)
 1824-01–1829-03: Robert Voorhees (resigned March 1829)
 1829-03–1838-03: John Lowrey
 1838-03–1843-11: Col. Alexander McWhorter Cumming (born 23 July 1802, died 16 July 1879; resigned November 1843)
 1843-11–1844-04: Henry Clow (vacancy)
 1844-04–1845-01: John Lowrey (died January 1845)
 1845-01–1845-04: James Vandeventer (vacancy)
 1845-04–1846-04: Col. Alexander McWhorter Cumming
 1846-04–1850-04: John T. Robinson
 1850-04–1851-01: J. I. Dunn (died January 1851)
 1851-02–1853-04: John Conover
 1853-04–1854-04: George T. Olmsted
 1854-04–1855-04: Richard Stockton Cumming (born 29 November 1833, died 18 January 1895)
 1855-04–1856-04: Augustus S. Martin
 1856-04–1858-04: Martin Voorhees
 1858-04–1860-04: Col. Alexander McWhorter Cumming
 1860-04–1861-04: O. H. Bartine
 1861-04–1862-04: Alex. M. Hudnut
 1862-04–1863-04: James T. L. Anderson
 1863-04–1864-04: Alex. M. Hudnut
 1864-04–1865-04: Hezekial Mount
 1865-04–1866-04: Richard Runyon
 1866-04–1868-04: Alex. M. Hudnut
 1868-04–1870-04: Eli R. Stonaker
 1870-04–1871-04: George T. Olmsted
 1871-04–1872-04: Charles O. Hudnut
 1872-04–1873-04: George T. Olmsted
 1873-04–1874-04: LeRoy Anderson (mayor) (resigned 1874)
 1874-04–1875-04: Richard Runyon (vacancy)
 1875-04–1877-04: F. S. Conover
 1877-04–1880-04: Charles S. Robinson (resigned)
 1880-04–1881-04: William J. Gibby (vacancy)
 1881-04–1883-04: John F. Hageman, Jr.
 1883-04–1885-04: William J. Gibby
 1885-04–1887-04: Josiah W. Wright
 1887-04–1888-04: Crowell Marsh (resigned)
 1888-04–1889-04: LeRoy H. Anderson (vacancy)
 1889-04–1891-04: Richard Stockton Cumming
 1891-04–1893-04: Augustus MacDonald

Since 2013 

Mayors of Princeton, New Jersey:
 2013-01-01–2020-12-31: Liz Lempert
 2021-01-01–present: Mark Freda

Princeton Borough (1893–2013) 

Mayors of Borough of Princeton, New Jersey:
 1893-04–1897-04: James L. Briner
 1897-04–1903-04: E. Mulford Updike
 1903-04–1906-01: H. L. Robinson
 1906-01–1911-02: H. L. Robinson (died 13 February 1911)
 1911-02–1916-01: Alexander Hamilton Phillips
 1916-01–1923-02-06: Charles Browne (born 1875, died 1947; resigned 6 February 1923)
 1923-02-06–1928-01: E. Mulford Updike
 1928-01–1930-01: B. Franklin Bunn
 1930-01–1936-01: Joseph S. Hoff
 1936-01–1946-01-01: Charles R. Erdman, Jr.
 1946-01-01–1948-01-01: Minot C. Morgan, Jr.
 1948-01-01–1950-01-01: Charles Rosenberry Erdman, Jr. (born 1897, died 1984)
 1950-01-01–1958-01-01: P. MacKay Sturges
 1958-01-01–1962-01-01: Raymond F. Male
 1962-01-01–1970-01-01: Henry S. Patterson, II
 1970-01-01–1984-01-01: Robert W. Cawley
 1984-01-01–1990-10-10: Barbara Boggs Sigmund (born 1939, died 10 October 1990)
 1990-11-08–1991-01-01: Marvin R. Reed, succeeded Barbara Boggs Sigmund upon her death, then reelected to three terms on his own.
 1991-01-01–2004-01-01: Marvin R. Reed
 2004-01-01–2005-10-21: Joseph P. O'Neill (died 21 October 2005)
 2005-11-09–2011-01-01: Mildred T. Trotman (born 6 May 1941)
 2011-01-01–2013-01-01: Yina Moore

Princeton Township (1893–2013) 

Mayors of Princeton Township, New Jersey:
 1900–1911: Moses Taylor Pyne
 1912: James Margerum
 1913: Charles McCarthy
 1914–1915: Reuben Fair
 1916–1917: Charles McCarthy
 1918: James Margerum
 1919–1921: W. E. Dempsey
 1922–1923: Elwood J. Lawrence
 1924: Edward L. Howe
 1925–1930: Theodore Pierson
 1931–1934: R. Lawrence Benson
 1935–1940: B. L. Gulick, Jr.
 1940–1950: B. Franklin Bunn
 1951–1954: Albert Salzman
 1955–1956: John H. Wallace, Jr.
 1956–1957: Ralph S. Maon
 1958: Charles A. Hurford
 1959–1963: Kenneth Fairman
 1964: William L. Wilson
 1965–1968: Carl C. Schafer, Jr.
 1969–1970: John D. Wallace
 1971: James A. Floyd (Twp. clerk seemed uncertain of this)
 1972: John D. Wallace
 1973–1976: Junius J. Bleiman
 1977–1981: Josephine H. Hall
 1982–1986: Winthrop Pike
 1986–1987: Gail Firestone
 1988: Cathleen R. “Kate” Litvak
 1989: Phyllis L. Marchand
 1990: Cathleen R. Litvak
 1991–1992: Richard C. Woodbridge
 1993: Laurence B. Glasberg
 1994: Phyllis L. Marchand
 1995: Michele Lois Tuck
 1996–1997: Michele Lois Tuck-Ponder
 1998–2008: Phyllis L. Marchand
 2009–2010: Bernard P. Miller
 2011–2013: Chad Goerner

References 

 
Princeton